Aloys Blumauer, also known as Alois Blumauer or Johannes Aloysius Blumauer, (21 or 22 December 1755 Steyr - 16 March 1798 Vienna) was an Austrian poet.

Biography
His works, which are chiefly coarse satires on the clergy and on the Jesuits (of which he himself had become a member a year before its dissolution in 1773), enjoyed a wide popularity. He is remembered, however, chiefly for his Abenteuer des frommen Helden Æneas (1784–88; published with introduction and commentary by E. Griesbach, 1872), a coarse travesty on Vergil's Aeneid. His complete works (Sämmtliche Werke) appeared after his death in four volumes (1801–03; republished 1884). Blumauer was also an acquaintance of Wolfgang Amadeus Mozart, collaborating on the song "Lied der Freiheit" (KV. 506) with him in 1786.

Notes

References
  This work in turn cites:
 Hofmann-Willenhof, Aloys Blumauer (Vienna, 1885)

External links
 
 

1755 births
1798 deaths
18th-century Austrian poets
Austrian male poets
18th-century male writers